This is a list of sports teams in Louisiana.

Professional teams
Current Teams

Amateur/Semi-Pro sports teams

American football
Women's Football Alliance
Louisiana Bayou Storm Surge
New Orleans Hurricanes

North Louisiana Football Alliance
Bossier City Bombers
Bossier City Roughnecks
Homer Lumberjacks
Minden Cyclones
Ruston Rattlers

Australian football
United States Australian Football League
Baton Rouge Tigers

Baseball
Texas Collegiate League
Acadiana Cane Cutters

Basketball
American Basketball Association
Alexandria Armor
Louisiana Kingdom Riders
Twin City Jazz

Hockey
North American Hockey League
Shreveport Mudbugs

Roller Derby
Women's Flat Track Derby Association
Acadiana Rollergirls (Lafayette)
Big Easy Rollergirls (New Orleans)
Cajun Rollergirls (Houma)
Red Stick Roller Derby (Baton Rouge)

Men's Roller Derby Association
New Orleans Brass Roller Derby (New Orleans)

Independent
Cenla Derby Dames (Alexandria)
Lethal Ladies/NSRD (Mandeville/Madisonville)
Pearl River Roller Derby (Slidell)
Twin City Knockers (Shreveport/Bossier)

Rugby
Deep South Rugby Football Union
Baton Rouge Rugby Football Club
New Orleans Rugby Football Club

Texas Geographical Union
Shreveport Rugby Football Club

Soccer
National Premier Soccer League
New Orleans Jesters
Gulf Coast Premier League 
Alexandria PBFC (Alexandria)
Baton Rouge Capitals
CABOSA Shreveport United S.C.
Cajun Rush (Lafayette)
Crescent City FC (New Orleans)
Louisiana Krewe (Lafayette)
Northshore United FC (Covington)

College teams

NCAA

 Division I Football Bowl Subdivision

Bulldogs and Lady Techsters – Louisiana Tech University – Conference USA
Green Wave – Tulane University – American Athletic Conference
Ragin' Cajuns – University of Louisiana at Lafayette – Sun Belt Conference
Tigers and Lady Tigers – Louisiana State University – Southeastern Conference
Warhawks – University of Louisiana at Monroe – Sun Belt Conference

 Division I Football Championship Subdivision

Colonels – Nicholls State University – Southland Conference
Cowboys and Cowgirls – McNeese State University – Southland Conference
Demons and Lady Demons – Northwestern State University – Southland Conference
Jaguars and Lady Jaguars – Southern University – Southwestern Athletic Conference
Lions and Lady Lions – Southeastern Louisiana University – Southland Conference
Privateers – University of New Orleans – Southland Conference
Tigers – Grambling State University – Southwestern Athletic Conference

 Division III

Gentlemen and Ladies – Centenary College of Louisiana – Southern Collegiate Athletic Conference
Wildcats and Lady Wildcats – Louisiana Christian University – American Southwest Conference

NAIA
Bleu Devils and Lady Bleu Devils – Dillard University
Generals – Louisiana State University of Alexandria
Gold Rush and Gold Nuggets – Xavier University of Louisiana
Knights and Lady Knights – Southern University at New Orleans
Pilots – Louisiana State University Shreveport
Wolf Pack – Loyola University New Orleans

NJCAA

Bears – Baton Rouge Community College
Bengals – Louisiana State University at Eunice
Cavaliers – Bossier Parish Community College
Dolphins – Delgado Community College
Jaguars – Southern University at Shreveport
Pelicans – Nunez Community College

Defunct professional and amateur/semi-pro teams

Defunct American football teams
Acadiana Zydeco (2010–2019) – WFA
Baton Rouge Blaze (2001) – af2
Bossier–Shreveport Battle Wings – (2001–2009) – af2, (2010) – AFL
Cenla Twin City/Louisiana Patriots - (2008-2010) - TLSWFA
Hammond Heroes (2006) – NIFL 
Houma Bayou Bucks (2002–2005) – NIFL
Houma Conquerors (2009) – SIFL
Lafayette Roughnecks (2001) – af2
Lafayette Wildcatters (2009–2010) – SIFL
Lake Charles Land Sharks (2002–2004) – NIFL
Louisiana Bayou Beast – (1998) – PIFL (1999) – IPFL, (2001) – NIFL
Louisiana Fuel – (2008–2010) – IWFL
Louisiana Jazz – (2002–2003) – NWFA, (2004–2014) – WFA
Louisiana Rangers – (2000) – IPFL, (2001–2002) – NIFL
Louisiana Swashbucklers – (2005) – NIFL, (2006–2008) – Intense, (2009–2011) – SIFL, (2012–2013) – PIFL 
New Orleans Breakers (1984) – USFL
New Orleans Jazz F.C. (2011) – Stars
New Orleans Krewe (2016) - U.S. Women's Football League
New Orleans Night (1991–1992) – AFL
New Orleans Thunder (1999) – Regional
New Orleans VooDoo (2004–2008), (2010–2015) – AFL
Shreveport Aftershock – (2007–2009) – IWFL
Shreveport-Bossier Bombers (2000) – IPFL
Shreveport Knights (1999) – RFL
Shreveport Pirates (1994–95) – CFL
Shreveport Shockhers (2006) – NWFA
Shreveport Steamer (1974–1975) – WFL
Shreveport Steamers (1979–1981) – AFA
Twin City Gators (2006) – NIFL

Defunct baseball teams

Abbeville A's (1935–1939) – Evangeline League
Abbeville Athletics (1946–1952) – Evangeline League
Abbeville Sluggers (1920) – Louisiana State League
Acadiana Cane Cutters (Lafayette) (2011–Current) – Texas Collegiate League
Alexandria Aces (1934–1942, 1946–1957) – Evangeline League (1972–1975) – Texas League (1994–2001) – Texas–Louisiana League, (2001–2003) – Central League, (2006–2008) – United League, (2009) –  Continental League, (2010–2012) – Texas Collegiate League, (2013) – United League
Alexandria Black Aces – Negro league baseball
Alexandria Hoo Hoos (1909) – Arkansas State League
Alexandria Lincoln Giants – Negro league baseball
Alexandria Reds (1925–1930) – Cotton States League
Alexandria Tigers (1920) – Louisiana State League
Alexandria White Sox (1907–1908) – Gulf Coast League
Arlington/Blue Stockings Base Ball Club (Shreveport) (1872)
Baton Rouge Black Sox – Negro league baseball
Baton Rouge Blue Marlins (2001) – All-American Association
Baton Rouge Cajuns (1902, 1905–1906) – Cotton States League
Baton Rouge Cougars (1976) – Gulf States League
Baton Rouge Essos (1929) – Cotton States League
Baton Rouge Hardwood Sports – Negro league baseball
Baton Rouge Highlanders (1930) – Cotton States League
Baton Rouge Rebels (1956–57) – Evangeline League
Baton Rouge Red Sticks (1903–1904) – Cotton States League (1934) East Dixie League (1946–55) – Evangeline League
Baton Rouge Riverbats (2002–2003) – Southeastern League 
Baton Rouge Senators (1932) – Cotton States League
Baton Rouge Solons (1933) – Dixie League
Baton Rouge Standards (1931) – Cotton States League
Baton Rouge Stars – Negro league baseball
Bayou Bullfrogs (Lafayette) (1998–1999) – Texas–Louisiana League 
Beauregard Base Ball Club (Ponchatoula) (1870)
Capitol/Red Stick Base Ball Club (Baton Rouge) (1867)
Comet Base Ball Club (New Orleans) (1860)
Crowley Millers (1950) – Gulf Coast League (1951–1957) – Evangeline League
Crowley Rice Birds (1908) – Gulf Coast League
Delta Base Ball Club (Delta) (1877)
DeQuincy Railroaders (1932) – Cotton States League
Detroit–New Orleans Stars (1960–1961) – Negro league baseball
Donaldsonville Grays – Semi-pro baseball
Favorite Base Ball Club (Lafayette) (1893)
Ferriday Stars – Negro league baseball
Gretna Lookouts – Negro league baseball
Hammond Berries (1946–51) – Evangeline League
Hammond Cubs – Negro league baseball
Hammond Hard Hitters – Negro league baseball
Hancock Base Ball Club (New Orleans) (1869)
Hop Bitters Base Ball Club (New Orleans) (1880)
Hope Base Ball Club (New Orleans) (1868)
Houma Buccaneers/Natchez Pilgrims (1940) – Evangeline League
Houma Delta Cubs – Negro league baseball 
Houma Hawks (2003) – Southeastern League
Houma Indians (1946–1952) – Evangeline League
Invincibles Base Ball Club (Royville) (1893)
Jeanerette Blues (1934–1939) – Evangeline League
Lafayette Browns (1908) – Gulf Coast League
Lafayette Bullfrogs (2000) – Texas–Louisiana League 
Lafayette Bulls (1948–53) – Evangeline League
Lafayette Drillers (1975–1976) – Texas League 
Lafayette Hubs (1920) – Louisiana State League
Lafayette Oilers (1954–57) – Evangeline League
Lafayette White Sox (1934–42) – Evangeline League
Lake Charles Creoles (1906) – South Texas League (1907–1908) – Gulf Coast League  
Lake Charles Explorers (1934) – Evangeline League
Lake Charles Giants (1956–57) – Evangeline League
Lake Charles Lakers (1950) – Gulf Coast League (1951–55) – Evangeline League
Lake Charles Lincoln Giants – Negro league baseball
Lake Charles Newporters (1929–1930) – Cotton States League
Lake Charles Skippers (1935–1942) – Evangeline League
Leesville Angels (1950) – Gulf Coast League  
Lone Star Base Ball Club (Pineville) (1871)
Lone Star Base Ball Club (New Orleans) (1859, 1869)
Louisiana Travellers
Mandeville Base Ball Club (Mandeville) (1869)
Melpomene White Sox – Negro league baseball
Meraux Tigers – Negro league baseball
Metairie Pelicans – Negro league baseball
Monroe Drillers (1924–1930) – Cotton States League  
Monroe Hill Citys (1903–1904) – Cotton States League 
Monroe Monarchs (1931–1932) – Negro Southern League
Monroe Municipals (1907) – Gulf Coast League (1908) – Cotton States League
Monroe Pearl Diggers (1909) – Arkansas State League
Monroe Southern Giants (1923) – Texas Colored League 
Monroe Sports (1950–1955) – Cotton States League (1956) – Evangeline League
Monroe Twins (1931–1932, 1937) – Cotton States League
Monroe White Sox (1938–1941) – Cotton States League

Morgan City Bears – Negro league baseball
Morgan City Black Sox – Negro league baseball
Morgan City Oyster Shuckers (1908) – Gulf Coast League  
Morehouse Bluffers Base Ball Club (Bastrop) (1879)
Natchitoches Base Ball Club (Natchitoches) (1874)
New Iberia Cardinals (1934–1942, 1946–1947, 1949, 1953) – Evangeline League
New Iberia Indians (1956) – Evangeline League
New Iberia Pelicans (1948, 1951–1952, 1954–1955) – Evangeline League
New Iberia Rebels (1950) – Evangeline League
New Iberia Sugar Boys (1920) – Louisiana State League 
New Orleans Acid Iron Earth (f. 1886) – Gulf League
New Orleans Ads (1920–21, 1935–36) – Negro Southern League 
New Orleans Algiers Giants (1926) – Independent Negro leagues 
New Orleans Baseball Club (f. 1886) – Gulf League
New Orleans Black Eagles 
New Orleans Black Pelicans (1907–08, 1938) – Independent Negro league, (1920, 1926, 1945) – Negro Southern League, (1931) – Texas–Louisiana League (Negro league) (1951, 1954) – Negro American League
New Orleans Black Rappers (f. 1907) – Independent Negro leagues 
New Orleans Blue Rappers (f. 1907) – Independent Negro leagues 
New Orleans Cohens – Negro league baseball
New Orleans Creoles (1947–48, 1950–51) – Negro Southern League, (1949) – Negro Texas League, 
New Orleans Crescents – Negro league baseball 
New Orleans Crescents/Unions (f. 1886) – Southern League of Colored Base Ballists
New Orleans Crescent Stars (1921, 1932–33, 1935–37) – Independent Negro leagues (1922, 1934) – Negro Southern League (1923) – Texas Colored League 
New Orleans Dumonts – Negro league baseball
New Orleans Eagles (1915–16) – Negro league baseball
New Orleans Eclipse (f. 1907) – Independent Negro leagues 
New Orleans Expos (f. 1886) – Independent
New Orleans Little Pels (1912) – Cotton States League  
New Orleans Pelicans (1887, 1889, 1898–1899) – Southern League (1888) – Texas-Southern League (1890, 1892–1896, 1901–1959) – Southern Association (1977) – American Association 
New Orleans Pinchbacks – Negro league baseball
New Orleans Stars (1924) – Independent Negro leagues 
New Orleans Zephyrs/Baby Cakes (1993–1997) – American Association (1998–2019) – Pacific Coast League
Oakdale Lumberjacks (1920) – Louisiana State League 
Opelousas Indians (1907) – Gulf Coast League (1934–41) – Evangeline League 
Opelousas Orphans (1932) – Cotton States League  
Ouachita Base Ball Club (Monroe) (1873)
Pelican Base Ball Club (New Orleans) (1865–1867), (1868–1874) – Louisiana Base Ball Association (1875–1879), (1880–1884) – Crescent City League
Plaquemine Tigers – Negro league baseball
Rapides Base Ball Club (Alexandria) (1871)
Rayne Red Sox (1934) – Evangeline League
Rayne Rice Birds (1920) – Louisiana State League (1935–1941) – Evangeline League
Reveille/Jackson Base Ball Club (Greenville) (1867)
Robert E. Lee Base Ball Club (New Orleans) (f. 1864, 1869, 1886) – Gulf League
St. Francisville Base Ball Club (St. Francisville) (1878)
St. Louis–New Orleans Stars (1940–1941) – Negro American League
Scotlandville White Sox – Negro league baseball
Secret 9 Base Ball Team – Negro league baseball
Shreveport Acme Giants (1923) – Texas Colored League
Shreveport Black Sports (1926) – Texas Colored League (1927–28), (1929–30) – Texas–Oklahoma–Louisiana League, (1931) – Texas–Louisiana League (Negro league) (1946) – East Texas Negro League 
Shreveport Braves (1968–1970) – Texas League
Shreveport Captains (1971) – Dixie Association (1972–2000) – Texas League
Shreveport Gassers (1915–1924) – Texas League 
Shreveport Giants (1901–1903) – Southern Association
Shreveport Grays (1895) – Texas-Southern League 
Shreveport Pirates (1904–1910) – Southern Association (1908–1910) – Texas League
Shreveport Sports (1925–32, 1938–42, 1946–57) – Texas League (1933) – Dixie League (1934) – East Dixie League (1935) – West Dixie League (1959–1961) – Southern Association, (2003–2005) – Central League, (2006–2008) – American Association
Shreveport Swamp Dragons (2001–2002) – Texas League
Shreveport Tigers (1899) – Southern League, (1949) – Negro Texas League 
Shreveport Travelers (1951) – Arkansas–Louisiana–Texas League
Shreveport-Bossier Captains (2009–2011) – American Association
Shrewsbury Globetrotters – Negro league baseball
Slidell Creoles – Negro league baseball
South Louisiana Pipeliners (Morgan City) (2009) – Continental League
Southern Base Ball Club (New Orleans) 1869
Stonewall Base Ball Club (Algiers) (1867)
Stonewall Base Ball Club (Pilette) (1893)
Thibodaux Giants (1946–1953) – Evangeline League 
Thibodaux Pilots (1954) – Evangeline League
Thibodaux Senators (1956–57) – Evangeline League
Waterloo Base Ball Club (Pointe Coupee) (1878)
West Baton Rouge Cubs – Negro league baseball
Winnfield Devils – Negro league baseball

Defunct basketball teams
Lake Charles Corsairs (2012–2013) – ABA (Did Not Play) 
Lake Charles Hurricanes – ABA (Did Not Play)
Louisiana Cajun All Stars/New Orleans Cajun All Stars (2015–2016 DNP, 2017–2018) – ABA, (2016–2017) – NABL
Louisiana Cajun Pelicans (Baton Rouge) (2004–2005) – ABA
Louisiana Gators (Lake Charles) (2012–2013) – ABA
Louisiana Soul (Lafayette) (2013) – PBL, (2014) –  IBA/ABA, (2014–2015) – UBA
Louisiana United (Lafayette) (2010–2011) – ABA
Miss-Lou Warriors (Ferriday) (2016–2018) - NABL 
Monroe Magicians (2013–2014) – ABA
New Orleans Blues/Louisiana Blues (2006–2007) – ABA (Did Not Play)
New Orleans Buccaneers (1967–1970) – American Basketball Association
New Orleans Cougars (2013–2014) – ABA
New Orleans Hurricanes (1947–1948) – Professional Basketball League of America
New Orleans Jazz (1974–1979) – NBA
New Orleans Pride (1979–1981) – Women's Professional Basketball League
New Orleans Sports (1948–1949) – Southern Basketball League
Shreveport Crawdads (1994) – Continental Basketball Association
Shreveport Stallions – ABA
Shreveport Storm (1995) – Continental Basketball Association
Shreveport-Bossier Flight (2016) – NABL/ABA 
Shreveport-Bossier Mavericks (2013–2015) – ABA

Defunct hockey teams
Alexandria Warthogs (1998–2000) – WPHL
Baton Rouge Kingfish (1996–2003) – ECHL
Bossier-Shreveport Mudbugs (1997–2001) – WPHL, (2001–2011) CHL
Cajun Catahoulas (2005–2006) – WSHL 
Lake Charles Ice Pirates (1997–2001) – WPHL
Louisiana IceGators (1995–2005) – ECHL
Louisiana IceGators (2009–2016) – SPHL
Monroe Moccasins (1997–2001) – WPHL
New Orleans Brass (1997–2002) – ECHL

Defunct soccer teams
Baton Rouge Bombers (1997–1998) – EISL
Baton Rouge Capitals (2007–2011) – PDL
FC New Orleans (2012) – NPSL
Lafayette SwampCats (1997–1998) – EISL
Lafayette Swamp Cats (2000–2004) – PDL
Lake City Gamblers (2014–2017) – GCPL
Louisiana Fire (2016–2017) – GCPL
New Orleans Riverboat Gamblers (1993–1998) / New Orleans Storm (1999) – PDL
Nicholls State University Club (2014–2015) – GCPL
Shreveport Lady Rafters (2017) – WPSL
Shreveport Rafters FC (2016–2018) – NPSL
Shreveport Rafters FC B (2016–2017) – GCPL
Shreveport/Bossier Lions (1998) – USISL D-3 Pro League

See also
 Sports in New Orleans
 Sports in Shreveport-Bossier

References

Louisiana

Teams